The Election Commission of Pakistan has a four-member panel from all the four provinces (Punjab, Sindh, Balochistan and Khyber Pakhtunkhwa) and four Provincial Election Commissioners. The Commission transacts its business by holding meetings. All members of the Election Commission have equal status and say in the decisions of the Commission.

The President of Pakistan appoints the Chief Election Commissioner and four members of Election Commission. The Prime Minister and Leader of the Opposition in the National Assembly recommends three names for appointment of CEC and for each Member to a parliamentary committee for hearing and confirmation of any one person against each post.

List of officers and members

See also
 Chief Election Commissioner of Pakistan
 Election Commission of Pakistan

References

External links
 Official website of the Election Commission of Pakistan

Election Commission of Pakistan
Members of election commissions